Deroplatys moultoni is a species of praying mantis in the family Deroplatyidae.

This "dead leaf mantis" species is native to Southeast Asia.

See also
 
 List of mantis genera and species

References

moultoni
Mantodea of Southeast Asia
Insects described in 1917